Jokajdon tumidulus is a species of small air-breathing land snails, terrestrial pulmonate gastropod mollusks in the family Charopidae. This species is endemic to Micronesia.

References

Fauna of Micronesia
Jokajdon
Taxonomy articles created by Polbot